Annie Raja is an Indian politician and leader of Communist Party of India 
. She is the General Secretary of  National Federation of Indian Women (NFIW). She is also a member of the National Executive of Communist Party of India.
She is married to present General Secretary of Communist Party of India, D Raja.

References

Communist Party of India politicians from Kerala
Female politicians of the Communist Party of India
Living people
Year of birth missing (living people)
Place of birth missing (living people)
Communist Party of India politicians from Tamil Nadu
Women in Kerala politics
Women in Tamil Nadu politics
20th-century Indian women politicians
20th-century Indian politicians
21st-century Indian women politicians
21st-century Indian politicians